The 1965–66 Duke Blue Devils men's basketball team represented Duke University in the 1965–66 NCAA Division I men's basketball season. The head coach was Vic Bubas and the team finished the season with an overall record of 26–4.

Roster

References 

Duke Blue Devils men's basketball seasons
Duke
1965 in sports in North Carolina
1966 in sports in North Carolina
NCAA Division I men's basketball tournament Final Four seasons